Carlos Slim Domit (born 1967) is a Mexican businessman and the son of Carlos Slim Helú.

Early life
Carlos Slim Domit was born in 1967 in Mexico and is of Lebanese origin from both his maternal and paternal families. He is the eldest son of Carlos Slim Helú. He holds a degree in business administration from Universidad Anáhuac.

Career
Slim Domit served as the co-chairman of the ICT Task Force at the B20 2012 and Co Chair of the WEF Latin America in 2015, and currently serves as chairman of the board of America Movil, Grupo Carso, Grupo Sanborns and Telmex.
 
He is Member of the Senate of the FIA, of the board of directors at the Centro de Estudios de Historia de México Carso; Member of the Patronage of the Hospital Infantil de México and President of the Instituto Nacional de Nutrición Salvador Zubiran Patronage among other social organizations.

References

External links
Grupo Carso's Website
Telmex
Telcel
América Móvil
Fundación Carlos Slim
Escudería Telmex

1967 births
Living people
Businesspeople from Mexico City
Mexican telecommunications industry businesspeople
Universidad Anáhuac México alumni
Carlos
Carlos Slim